The year 1628 in science and technology involved some significant events.

Medicine and physiology
 William Harvey publishes his findings about blood circulation in Exercitatio Anatomica de Motu Cordis et Sanguinis in Animalibus (published in Frankfurt).

Births
 March 10 – Marcello Malpighi, Italian physiologist (died 1694)
 April 23 – Johann van Waveren Hudde, Dutch mathematician (died 1704)
 Constantijn Huygens, Dutch statesman and telescope maker (died 1697)

Deaths
 June 8 – Rudolph Goclenius, German philosopher and polymath (born 1547)
 Yi Su-gwang, Korean scholar-bureaucrat (born 1563)

References

 
17th century in science
1620s in science